Joan Claudi Montane Delneufcourt (born 18 September 1955) is an Andorran former boxer who represented his country at the 1976 Summer Olympics.

Montane was 20 years old when he competed in boxing at the 1976 Summer Olympics as a light heavyweight. In the first round of bouts he received a victory by walkover. In the second round he was up against the East German Ottomar Sachse, to whom he lost when the contest was stopped in the third round.

1976 Olympic results
 Round of 32: defeated Gabriel Daramole (Nigeria) by walkover
 Round of 16: lost to Ottomar Sachse (East Germany); referee stopped contest in third round

Notes

References

External links
 
 

1955 births
Living people
Andorran male boxers
Light-heavyweight boxers
Olympic boxers of Andorra
Boxers at the 1976 Summer Olympics